James Adamson (4 April 1929 – 8 November 2011) was an English professional footballer and football manager. He was born in Ashington, Northumberland. He made 486 appearances for Burnley ranking him sixth in their all-time appearance list.

Playing career
Adamson, a right-half, joined Burnley in January 1947 after playing non-league football in his native Ashington and working as a miner. His early career was interrupted by national service, which he completed with the Royal Air Force, meaning his debut had to wait until February 1951, when Burnley played away to Bolton Wanderers. He played once for the England B team, but never made the full England side.

He was an ever-present as Burnley won the First Division in 1959–60 and captained the side to the 1962 FA Cup Final which they lost against Tottenham Hotspur. He was also named Footballer of the Year in 1962.

Adamson formed a midfield partnership with inside-forward Jimmy McIlroy, around which much of Burnley's creative play was centred.

Coaching career
He retired in 1964, having played 426 league games, and joined the Burnley coaching staff. He had previously coached the England team in the 1962 World Cup in Chile and was the Football Association's preferred choice of manager ahead of Alf Ramsey but declined the offer.

In February 1970, when Burnley manager Harry Potts was made general manager, Adamson stepped up to become team manager. Burnley were relegated at the end his first full season in charge, but returned to the top-flight in 1973, winning the Second Division title.

Burnley were relegated again in 1976, although Adamson had already left that January. In May 1976 he was appointed as manager of Dutch side Sparta Rotterdam, but left the following month. In November 1976 he was made manager of Sunderland, but was unable to prevent them from relegation from the First Division.

He left Sunderland in October 1978, taking over from Jock Stein as manager of Leeds United. His time at Leeds is well remembered for the huge roars of "Adamson Out" with which the crowd greeted his later appearances. He left Leeds in October 1980. He took no further part in professional football and spent the rest of his life in Burnley.

Adamson died on 8 November 2011, aged 82.

On 1 August 2013 his biography was set to be released, written by Dave Thomas and published by Pitch Publishing .

Honours
Burnley
First Division champions: 1959–60
FA Cup runner-up: 1962

See also 

 List of one-club men

References

External links
Clarets Mad
Burnley F.C. Official Site
Full Managerial Stats for Leeds United from WAFLL

1929 births
2011 deaths
Military personnel from Northumberland
Sportspeople from Ashington
Footballers from Northumberland
English footballers
Association football wing halves
English Football League players
Burnley F.C. players
England B international footballers
1962 FIFA World Cup players
English football managers
Burnley F.C. managers
Sunderland A.F.C. managers
Leeds United F.C. managers
Sparta Rotterdam managers
Eredivisie managers
Expatriate football managers in the Netherlands
English expatriate football managers
English expatriate sportspeople in the Netherlands
20th-century Royal Air Force personnel
English miners
English Football League representative players
Royal Air Force airmen
FA Cup Final players